Fritz Christian Holte (24 March 1925 – 17 January 2015) was a Norwegian economist.

He was born in Tromsø, and was hired at the Norwegian College of Agriculture in 1954. He took his doctorate in 1962 and served as professor from 1974 to 1990. Books include Sosialøkonomi (1965, later reissued) and Økonomi og samfunn (1978, later reissued).

References 

1925 births
2015 deaths
People from Tromsø
Academic staff of the Norwegian College of Agriculture
20th-century Norwegian economists